Bucktown may refer to:

Bucktown, Indiana
Bucktown, Maryland
Bucktown, Pennsylvania
Bucktown, a neighborhood in Chicago, Illinois
Bucktown, a nickname (and former name) of Dunmore, Pennsylvania
"Bucktown", a 1994 single released by the hip-hop group Smif-N-Wessun
Bucktown (film), a film from 1975 starring Fred Williamson
Bucktown, Davenport, an historic area in the eastern end of downtown Davenport, Iowa